Cacuso  is a town and municipality in Malanje Province in Angola.

Transport 

It is served by a station on the Luanda Railways.

References

Populated places in Malanje Province
Municipalities of Angola